Dwight D. Eisenhower High School is a Title I public secondary school located in Near Northwest and in Houston, Texas, United States.

Eisenhower is a part of the Aldine Independent School District. The main campus is located at 7922 Antoine Drive, while the Eisenhower 9th Grade School is located at 3550 West Gulfbank Road.

Eisenhower serves multiple areas. The Inwood Forest community, and the western portion of the Acres Homes community are served by Eisenhower. In addition, the unincorporated Harris County communities of Bammel Trace, Mount Royal Village, Parkland Place, Greensfield Village, Willow Springs Villas, Woodland Trails and Woodgate Village are zoned to Eisenhower.

Eisenhower offers Advanced Placement courses, including World History, Calculus (AB and BC), Macroeconomics, Statistics, U.S. Government and Politics, English, Spanish, French, US History, Visual Arts and Psychology. Eisenhower also offers the International Baccalaureate Programme with courses including Higher Level English, Higher Level Spanish, Standard Level Spanish, Standard Level French, Higher Level History of the Americas, Standard Level Chemistry, Standard Level Physics, Higher Level Biology, Standard Level Mathematical Studies, Standard Level Mathematics, Higher Level Visual Arts, Higher Level Music,  In the past, Eisenhower sent at least two projects each year to the National History Day competition in Washington D.C., while having a top-tiered Academic Decathlon team that has progressed to the state competition three years in a row. In 1991, 1998 and 2009 the school hosted Texas French Symposium.

The school is nicknamed "Big Ike" and "Ike," after Dwight D. Eisenhower's nickname.

The school was named a National Blue Ribbon School in 1988–1989.

History
Eisenhower High School opened in 1972. When it first opened it was Jr/Sr high school going from the 7th-12th grade. Eisenhower was the first desegregated senior high school in the Aldine Independent School District.

Eisenhower 9th Grade School opened in 1999, relieving Eisenhower High School.

Academics
For each school year, the Texas Education Agency rates school performance using an A–F grading system based on statistical data. For 2018–2019, the school received a score of 77 out of 100, resulting in a C grade. The school received a score of 69 the previous year.

Demographics
In the 2018–2019 school year, there were 2,146 students. The ethnic distribution of students was:
 28.9% African American
 1.4% Asian
 66.8% Hispanic
 0.1% American Indian
 2.0% White
 0.7%  two or more races
64.8% of students were eligible for free or reduced-price lunch. The school was eligible for Title I funding.

Feeder pattern
EC PK/K schools that feed into Eisenhower High school include:
 Kujawa EC PK/K Center
 Reece EC PK/K Center
 Stovall EC PK/K Center
 Vines EC PK/K Center
Elementary schools that feed into Eisenhower High School include:
 Anderson Academy (partial)
 Bethune Academy (partial)
 Carmichael Elementary
 Carter Academy
 Conley Elementary
 Ermel Elementary
 Harris Academy
 Kujawa Elementary
 Sammons Elementary
 Smith Elementary
 Caraway Elementary 
 Hill Elementary 
 Houston Academy (partial)
 Wilson Elementary 
Middle schools that feed into Eisenhower High School include:
 Drew Academy (partial)
 Garcia Middle School
 Hoffman Middle School (partial)
 Plummer Middle School (partial)
 Shotwell Middle School (partial)

Partnership

In 2016, YES Prep Eisenhower opened inside the campus. It currently serves grades 9 to 12. These students take their core classes at YES Prep, but they participate in extra- curricular activities with Eisenhower. This is how YES Prep and Aldine work together.

Notable alumni

 Fred Miller, American football player
 Henry Thomas, Pro Bowl defensive tackle in the NFL, mostly with Minnesota Vikings, in late 1980s and 1990s.
 Slim Thug, American rapper
 Riff Raff, American rapper
 Jaelon Darden, American football player

References

External links

 
 Eisenhower Alumni Website
 Eisenhower Ninth Grade School (Old website)

Aldine Independent School District high schools
Public high schools in Houston
Educational institutions established in 1972